The 2003 Campeonato Nacional Clausura Copa Banco del Estado was the 74th Chilean League top flight tournament, in which Cobreloa won its seventh league title after beating Colo-Colo in the finals.

Qualifying stage

Scores

Group standings

Group A

Group B

Group C

Group D

Aggregate table

Re-qualifier

Audax Italiano qualify to playoffs as best placed team despite having drawn with Deportes Puerto Montt

Playoffs

First round
Santiago Wanderers and Palestino qualified as best losers.

Knockout stage

Finals

Top goalscorers

References

External links
RSSSF Chile 2003

Primera División de Chile seasons
Chile
2003 in Chilean football